Ashley Nazira (born 11 November 1995) is a Mauritian  professional footballer  who played for San Diego Loyal SC, an American professional soccer team based in San Diego, California, during the 2020 USL Championship season. Since 2021, he now plays for Saint-Pauloise FC, a football club based in Saint-Paul, Réunion, France.

Club career
Nazira began playing football at the age of six. He played for Boulet Rouge, a Mauritian Premier League club, for his entire career up until the 2019-2020 season. During his spell within Mauritian football, Nazira was the league's top goalscorer for four times. 

Following his time spent in his homeland, Nazira then signed for San Diego Loyal SC, the new USL Championship expansion team, on a 12-month deal in January 2020. By doing so, he became the first ever Mauritian  professional footballer to play in a top league in North America. 

He previously had a successful trial with Réunion Premier League club Saint-Pauloise FC in February 2019 after being top goal scorer in the Mauritian first division with twenty goals. However the signing was put on hold by the club for financial reasons.

Two and a half years after his failed attempt to join Saint-Pauloise FC, he finally signed for the Réunionese club in September 2021.

International career
Nazira made his senior international debut for Mauritius on 25 March 2015 in a 2–2 friendly draw with Burundi. With three goals, he was the join top-scorer at the 2019 COSAFA Cup.

International goals
Score and result list Mauritius's goal tally first.

International statistics

References

External links
National Football Teams profile
Soccerway profile
USL profile

1995 births
Living people
USL Championship players
Mauritian footballers
Association football forwards
San Diego Loyal SC players
Expatriate soccer players in the United States
Mauritian expatriate footballers
Mauritius international footballers
Mauritian expatriate sportspeople in the United States